The Metro Series is an annual college basketball rivalry game between the Detroit Mercy Titans and the Oakland Golden Grizzlies. Both schools are located in the U.S. state of Michigan in the Metro Detroit area, with Detroit Mercy being in the city of Detroit proper while Oakland is located in the Detroit suburb of Rochester. They are the only two Division I institutions in the Detroit area. Both compete as members of the Horizon League.

History
The two teams first met in the 1997-1998 season, which was Oakland's first season competing in Division I after it had competed at the Division II level for all seasons prior. In their first matchup, Detroit Mercy defeated the transitioning team in what would be the largest margin of defeat for the series to date, 110-61. The two teams faced off a few more times going into the 2000s, but with Detroit Mercy in the Midwestern Collegiate Conference (now the Horizon League) and Oakland joining the Mid-Continent Conference (now the Summit League), the series quickly fizzled out.

However, this changed in 2013, when Oakland announced it would be joining Detroit Mercy in the Horizon League for the 2013-2014 athletic season and beyond. This created a natural rivalry for the Titans, and with annual matchups between the two Detroit area schools now guaranteed for the foreseeable future, the Metro Series, as it began to be known, started to take off. Oakland won the first in-conference match-up between the schools on January 11, 2014, defeating the Titans 77-69.

2015 saw the addition of a trophy sponsored by the Michigan Sports Hall of Fame. Known as the Michigan Sports Hall of Fame Cup, it is awarded to the winner of the season basketball series between the two schools. Should the schools split the series, the cup is awarded to the team with the better Rating Percentage Index (RPI) at the time of the game. The inaugural trophy was won by Oakland in 2015; they split the series 1-1 with the Titans, but the Golden Grizzlies had the higher RPI at the end of the series, and thus were awarded the trophy.

Oakland has historically dominated the series since its inception, with Detroit Mercy having only won three games against them since the Golden Grizzlies first joined the Horizon League and winning ten straight matchups from 2017 to 2021. The latest match also resulted in a victory for Oakland, defeating Detroit Mercy at the Grizzlies' Athletics Center O'rena 75-59.

Men's results

References

College basketball rivalries in the United States
Detroit Mercy Titans basketball
Oakland Golden Grizzlies basketball
Basketball competitions in Detroit